Audrain County Courthouse, also known as Audrain County Memorial Courthouse, is a historic courthouse located at Mexico, Audrain County, Missouri. It was built in 1951, and is a three-story, cubic form, brick building with streamlined Classical Revival styling. The interior features a three-story rotunda that is lined with balconies and lit by a large art glass skylight.  Located on the property are the contributing flagpole (1951), a miniature replica of the Statue of Liberty (1959), a memorial water fountain (c. 1920s), and the headstone of a prominent early citizen (pre-1959).

It was listed on the National Register of Historic Places in 2012.

References

External links

County courthouses in Missouri
Courthouses on the National Register of Historic Places in Missouri
Neoclassical architecture in Missouri
Government buildings completed in 1951
Buildings and structures in Audrain County, Missouri
National Register of Historic Places in Audrain County, Missouri
1951 establishments in Missouri